The men's 4 × 100 metres relay event at the 2019 Asian Athletics Championships was held on 22 and 23 April.

Medalists

Results

Heats

Final

References

Relay
Relays at the Asian Athletics Championships